Phyllobacterium brassicacearum is a Gram-negative, motile bacteria from the genus of Phyllobacterium which was isolated from rhizoplane of the plant Brassica napus.

References

Phyllobacteriaceae
Bacteria described in 2006